Andrew Amador is an American television and radio personality. Andrew has worked as a news anchor, entertainment correspondent and reporter for television stations in Los Angeles, San Francisco and Detroit; he also has anchored and reported for CBS Radio in Los Angeles (KNX, KFWB). 

A fixture on Los Angeles television for many years, Angelenos may remember Andrew as the personable weathercaster and environmental reporter for KHJ-TV (now KCAL-TV). Andrew was nominated for a feature story Emmy while there.
 
Andrew has twice been nominated for local news Emmys and was recognized for his journalistic excellence by the Associated Press, The Radio-Television Digital News Association and the Los Angeles Press Club. He is the recipient of a Golden Mike for his reporting work at KNX.

Andrew's acting resume is highlighted by roles in L.A. Story, The First Power, "Taking Care of Business" and "The Net." Network television appearances include work on "Dallas," "Murder She Wrote," "Quantum Leap," "The Hogan Family," and other hit TV shows.
  
His commercial voiceover, narration, film trailer and promo portfolio encompasses a wide range of projects, including campaigns for recording artists associated with nearly every major label in the U.S. and abroad.  

Los Angeles theatre roles include blind baseball fan Greg in an award-winning production of "Bleacher Bums," iconic playboy Elyot Chase in a well-received revival of Noël Coward's "Private Lives," and the pompous Petkoff in Shaw's "Arms and the Man."

References

External links
http://www.imdb.com/name/nm0023777/

Living people
American television personalities
Male television personalities
Year of birth missing (living people)